This is a list of high schools in the state of Massachusetts.

Barnstable County

 Cape Cod Academy, Osterville
 Dennis-Yarmouth Regional High School, South Yarmouth
 Mashpee Middle-High School, Mashpee
 Nauset Regional High School, Eastham
 Sandwich High School, East Sandwich
 Trinity Christian Academy of Cape Cod, Barnstable

Bourne

 Bourne High School
 Upper Cape Cod Regional Technical School

Falmouth

 Falmouth Academy
 Falmouth High School

Hyannis

 Barnstable High School
 St. John Paul II High School
 Sturgis Charter Public School

Harwich

 Cape Cod Regional Technical High School
 Monomoy Regional High School

Berkshire County

 Berkshire Arts & Technology Charter Public School, Adams
 Hoosac Valley High School, Cheshire
 Lee High School, Lee
 Wahconah Regional High School, Dalton

Great Barrington

 John Dewey Academy
 Monument Mountain Regional High School

Lenox

 Berkshire Country Day School
 Lenox Memorial High School

North Adams

 Charles H. McCann Technical High School
 Drury High School

Pittsfield

 Miss Hall's School
 Pittsfield High School
 St. Joseph Central High School
 Taconic High School

Sheffield

 Berkshire School
 Mount Everett Regional School

Williamstown

 Buxton School
 Mount Greylock Regional High School

Bristol County

 Bishop Stang High School, North Dartmouth
 Dartmouth High School, Dartmouth
 Fairhaven High School, Fairhaven
 Joseph Case High School, Swansea
 North Attleborough High School, North Attleborough
 Norton High School, Norton
 Seekonk High School, Seekonk
 Somerset Berkley Regional High School, Somerset
 Westport High School, Westport

Attleboro

 Attleboro Community Academy
 Attleboro High School
 Bishop Feehan High School

Dighton

 Bristol County Agricultural High School
 Dighton-Rehoboth Regional High School

Easton

 Oliver Ames High School
 Southeastern Regional Vocational Technical High School]

Fall River

 Argosy Collegiate Charter School
 Atlantis Charter School
 B.M.C. Durfee High School
 Bishop Connolly High School
 Diman Regional Vocational Technical High School

Mansfield

 Al Noor Academy
 Mansfield High School

New Bedford

 Greater New Bedford Regional Vocational-Technical High School
 New Bedford High School

Taunton

 Bristol-Plymouth Regional Technical School
 Taunton High School

Dukes County

 The Martha's Vineyard Public Charter School, West Tisbury
 Martha's Vineyard Regional High School, Oak Bluffs

Essex County

 Georgetown High School, Georgetown
 Gloucester High School, Gloucester
 Ipswich High School, Ipswich
 Lynnfield High School, Lynnfield
 Manchester-Essex Regional Junior-Senior High School, Manchester-by-the-Sea
 Marblehead High School, Marblehead
 Masconomet Regional High School, Boxford
 Newburyport High School, Newburyport
 North Shore Technical High School, Middleton
 Pentucket Regional High School, West Newbury
 Rockport High School, Rockport
 Salem High School, Salem
 Saugus High School, Saugus
 Swampscott High School, Swampscott

Amesbury

 Amesbury High School
 Amesbury Innovation High School

Andover

 Andover High School
 Greater Lawrence Technical School
 Phillips Academy

Beverly

 Beverly High School
 Northshore Academy
 The Waring School

Danvers

 Danvers High School
 Essex Agricultural and Technical High School
 St. John's Preparatory School

Hamilton

 Hamilton-Wenham Regional High School
 Pingree School

Haverhill

 Bradford Christian Academy
 Haverhill High School
 Whittier Regional Vocational Technical High School

Lawrence

 Central Catholic High School
 Lawrence High School

Lynn

 Lynn Classical High School
 Lynn English High School
 Lynn Vocational and Technical Institute
 St. Mary's High School

Methuen

 Methuen High School
 Notre Dame Cristo Rey High School

Newbury

 The Governor's Academy
 Triton Regional High School

North Andover

 Brooks School
 North Andover High School

Peabody

 Bishop Fenwick High School
 Peabody Veterans Memorial High School

Franklin County

 Mohawk Trail Regional High School, Buckland
 Ralph C. Mahar Regional High School, Orange
 Academy at Charlemont, Charlemont

Deerfield

 Deerfield Academy
 Frontier Regional High School

Greenfield

 Four Rivers Charter Public School
 Greenfield High School
 Stoneleigh-Burnham School

Montague

 Franklin County Technical School
 Turners Falls High School

Northfield

 Northfield Mount Hermon School
 Pioneer Valley Regional School

Hampden County

 Agawam High School, Agawam
 East Longmeadow High School, East Longmeadow
 Holyoke High School/Holyoke High School Dean Campus/Holyoke High School Opportunity Academy, Holyoke
 Longmeadow High School, Longmeadow
 Ludlow High School, Ludlow
 Monson High School, Monson
 Saint Mary High School, Westfield
 Southwick-Tolland Regional High School, Southwick
 West Springfield High School, West Springfield

Chicopee

 Chicopee Comprehensive High School
 Chicopee High School

Palmer

 Palmer High School
 Pathfinder Vocational Technical High School

Springfield

 Cathedral High School
 High School of Commerce
 Pioneer Valley Christian School
 Roger L Putnam Vocational-Technical High School
 Springfield Central High School
 Springfield High School of Science and Technology
 Springfield International Charter School
 The Springfield Renaissance School

Westfield

 Westfield High School
 Westfield Vocational Technical High School

Wilbraham

 Minnechaug Regional High School
 Wilbraham & Monson Academy

Hampshire County

 Academy at Swift River, Cummington
 Amherst Regional High School, Amherst
 Belchertown High School, Belchertown
 Gateway Regional High School, Huntington
 Hampshire Regional High School, Westhampton
 Hopkins Academy, Hadley
 Smith Academy, Hatfield
 Ware Junior Senior High School, Ware

Easthampton

 Easthampton High School
 Williston Northampton School

Granby

 Granby Junior Senior High School
 MacDuffie School

Northampton

 Northampton High School
 Smith Vocational and Agricultural High School

South Hadley

 Pioneer Valley Performing Arts Charter Public School
 South Hadley High School

Middlesex County

Eastern Middlesex County (Boston Metro Area)

 Burlington High School, Burlington
 Melrose High School, Melrose
 North Reading High School, North Reading
 Stoneham High School, Stoneham
 Watertown High School, Watertown
 Wilmington High School, Wilmington
 Winchester High School, Winchester
 Woburn Memorial High School, Woburn

Arlington

 Arlington Catholic High School
 Arlington High School

Belmont

 The Arlington School
 Belmont High School
 Belmont Hill School

Cambridge

 Buckingham Browne & Nichols
 Cambridge Rindge and Latin School
 Community Charter School of Cambridge
 Cristo Rey Boston High School
 International School of Boston
 Matignon High School

Everett

 Everett High School
 Pioneer Charter School of Science
 Pope John XXIII High School

Lexington

 Lexington Christian Academy
 Lexington High School
 Minuteman Regional High School

Malden

 Malden Catholic High School
 Malden High School
 Mystic Valley Regional Charter School

Medford

 Curtis-Tufts School
 Medford High School
 Saint Clement High School

Newton

 Mount Alvernia High School
 Newton Country Day School
 Newton North High School
 Newton South High School
 Trinity Catholic High School

Reading

 Austin Preparatory School
 Reading Memorial High School

Somerville

 Prospect Hill Academy
 Somerville High School

Wakefield

 Northeast Metro Tech
 Our Lady of Nazareth Academy
 Wakefield Memorial High School

Waltham

 Chapel Hill – Chauncy Hall School
 Gann Academy
 Waltham High School

Northern Middlesex County

 Ayer Shirley Regional High School, Ayer
 Chelmsford High School, Chelmsford
 Dracut High School, Dracut
 Francis W. Parker Charter Essential School, Devens
 Littleton High School, Littleton
 Maynard High School, Maynard
 North Middlesex Regional High School, Townsend
 Peter Fitzpatrick School, Pepperell
 Tewksbury Memorial High School, Tewksbury

Billerica

 Billerica Memorial High School
 Shawsheen Valley Technical High School

Groton

 Groton School
 Groton-Dunstable Regional High School
 Lawrence Academy at Groton

Lawrence

 Abbot Lawrence Academy
 Lawrence High School

Lowell

 Lowell Catholic High School
 Lowell High School
 Lowell Middlesex Academy Charter School

Tyngsborough

 Academy of Notre Dame
 Greater Lowell Technical High School
 Innovation Academy Charter School
 Tyngsborough High School

Westford

 Nashoba Valley Technical High School
 Westford Academy

Southern Middlesex County

 Ashland High School, Ashland
 Holliston High School, Holliston
 Hopkinton High School, Hopkinton

Framingham

 Framingham High School
 Keefe Regional Technical School
 The Learning Center for the Deaf
 Marian High School
 Sudbury Valley School

Natick

 Natick High School
 Walnut Hill School

Western Middlesex County

 Acton-Boxborough Regional High School, Acton
 Bedford High School, Bedford
 The Carroll School, Lincoln
 Lincoln-Sudbury Regional High School, Sudbury
 Wayland High School, Wayland

Concord

 Concord Academy
 Concord-Carlisle High School
 Middlesex School

Hudson

 Hudson Catholic High School
 Hudson High School

Marlborough

 Advanced Math and Science Academy Charter School
 Assabet Valley Regional Technical High School
 Marlborough High School

Weston

 The Cambridge School of Weston
 Gifford School
 The Rivers School
 Weston High School

Nantucket County
 Nantucket High School, Nantucket

Norfolk County

 Avon Middle High School, Avon
 Bellingham High School, Bellingham
 Cohasset High School, Cohasset
 Dover-Sherborn High School, Dover
 Foxborough High School, Foxborough
 Holbrook Middle High School, Holbrook
 King Philip Regional High School, Wrentham
 Medfield High School, Medfield
 Medway High School, Medway
 Millis High School, Millis
 Norwood High School, Norwood
 Sharon High School, Sharon
 Stoughton High School, Stoughton

Braintree

 Archbishop Williams High School
 Braintree High School

Brookline

 Brookline High School
 Dexter School
 Maimonides School
 Southfield School

Canton

 Blue Hills Regional Technical School
 Canton High School

Dedham

 Dedham High School
 Noble and Greenough School
 Ursuline Academy

Franklin

 Franklin High School
 Tri-County Regional Vocational Technical High School

Milton

 Fontbonne Academy
 Milton Academy
 Milton High School

Needham

 Needham High School
 Saint Sebastian's School

Quincy

 North Quincy High School
 Quincy High School

Randolph

 The Learning Center for the Deaf
 Randolph High School

Walpole

 Norfolk County Agricultural High School
 Walpole High School

Wellesley

 Dana Hall School
 Wellesley High School

Westwood

 Westwood High School
 Xaverian Brothers High School

Weymouth

 South Shore Christian Academy
 Weymouth High School

Plymouth County

 Abington High School, Abington
 Apponequet Regional High School, Lakeville
 Bridgewater-Raynham Regional High School, Bridgewater
 Carver Middle High School, Carver
 Duxbury High School, Duxbury
 East Bridgewater High School, East Bridgewater
 Hull High School, Hull
 Marshfield High School, Marshfield
 Middleborough High School, Middleborough
 Norwell High School, Norwell
 Old Colony Regional Vocational Technical High School, Rochester
 Old Rochester Regional High School, Mattapoisett
 Pembroke High School, Pembroke
 Rockland Senior High School, Rockland
 Scituate High School, Scituate
 Silver Lake Regional High School, Kingston
 Tabor Academy, Marion
 Wareham High School, Wareham
 West Bridgewater Middle-Senior High School, West Bridgewater
 Whitman-Hanson Regional High School, Whitman

Brockton

 Brockton High School
 Cardinal Spellman High School
 Champion High School

Hanover

 Hanover High School
 South Shore Vocational Technical High School

Hingham

 Hingham High School
 Notre Dame Academy

Plymouth

 Plymouth North High School
 Plymouth South High School
 Plymouth South Technical High School

Suffolk County

Public/Magnet Schools

 Boston Arts Academy
 Boston Community Leadership Academy
 Boston Latin Academy, Roxbury
 Boston Latin School
 Brighton High School
 Charlestown High School, Charlestown
 Chelsea High School, Chelsea
 Dorchester High School, Dorchester
 East Boston High School
 Horace Mann School for the Deaf and Hard of Hearing, Allston
 English High School of Boston
 Fenway High School
 Greater Egleston High School, Jamaica Plain
 Jeremiah E. Burke High School, Dorchester
 John D. O'Bryant School of Mathematics & Science, Roxbury
 Madison Park Technical Vocational High School, Roxbury
 New Mission High School, Hyde Park
 Revere High School, Revere
 SeaCoast High School, Revere
 TechBoston Academy, Brighton
 Winthrop High School, Winthrop

Charter Schools

 Academy of the Pacific Rim Charter Public School, Hyde Park
 Boston Day and Evening Academy, Roxbury
 City on a Hill Charter School
 Codman Academy Charter Public School, Dorchester
 Edward M. Kennedy Academy for Health Careers
 Excel High School
 Match High School
 Phoenix Charter Academy, Chelsea

Private Schools

 Boston College High School, Dorchester
 Boston University Academy
 British School of Boston
 Cathedral High School
 Catholic Memorial High School, West Roxbury
 Commonwealth School
 Mesivta High School of Greater Boston, Brighton
 Mount Saint Joseph Academy, Brighton
 The Newman School
 Roxbury Latin School, West Roxbury
 Snowden International School, Boston

Worcester County

Northeastern Worcester County

 The Bromfield School, Harvard
 Tahanto Regional High School, Boylston
 Clinton High School, Clinton
 Leominster High School/Center for Technical Education Innovation, Leominster
 Lunenburg High School, Lunenburg
 Nashoba Regional High School, Bolton
 West Boylston Middle/High School, West Boylston

Fitchburg

 Fitchburg High School
 Montachusett Regional Vocational Technical School
 Notre Dame Preparatory School
 Sizer School
 St. Bernard's Central Catholic High School

Lancaster

 South Lancaster Academy
 Trivium School

Northwestern Worcester County

 Athol High School, Athol
 Eagle Hill School, Hardwick
 Gardner High School, Gardner
 Narragansett Regional High School, Templeton
 Wachusett Regional High School, Holden

Ashburnham

 Cushing Academy
 Oakmont Regional High School

Barre

 Quabbin Regional High School
 Stetson School

Winchendon

 Murdock Middle/High School
 The Winchendon School

Southeastern Worcester County

 Auburn High School, Auburn
 Bartlett High School, Webster
 Bay Path Regional Vocational Technical High School, Charlton
 David Prouty High School, Spencer
 Leicester High School, Leicester
 North Brookfield High School, North Brookfield
 Oxford High School, Oxford
 Quaboag Regional Middle High School, Warren
 Shepherd Hill Regional High School, Dudley
 Southbridge High School, Southbridge
 Tantasqua Regional High School/Tantasqua Technical Division, Sturbridge

Southwestern Worcester County

 Algonquin Regional High School, Northborough
 Blackstone-Millville Regional High School, Blackstone
 Douglas High School, Douglas
 Grafton High School, Grafton
 Hopedale Junior Senior High School, Hopedale
 Milford High School, Milford
 Millbury Junior/Senior High School, Millbury
 St. Mark's School, Southborough
 Sutton High School, Sutton
 Uxbridge High School, Uxbridge
 Westborough High School, Westborough

Northbridge

 Northbridge High School
 Whitinsville Christian School

Shrewsbury

 Shrewsbury High School
 St. John's High School

Upton

 Blackstone Valley Regional Vocational Technical High School
 Nipmuc Regional High School

Worcester

 Abby Kelley Foster Charter Public School
 Bancroft School
 Burncoat High School
 Doherty Memorial High School
 Massachusetts Academy of Math and Science at WPI
 North High School
 Notre Dame Academy
 St. Paul Diocesan Junior-Senior High School
 South High Community School
 Spirit of Knowledge Charter School
 University Park Campus School
 Worcester Academy
 Worcester Technical High School

See also
 Massachusetts Board of Education
 Massachusetts Department of Elementary and Secondary Education

 
Massachusetts
High schools